Rise and Shine may refer to:

Music

Albums
 Rise & Shine, (2001), an album by Adeaze
 Rise and Shine (2013), an album by Louna
 Rise and Shine (2020), an album by Cassadee Pope
 Rise & Shine (Ian McLagan album), 2004
 Rise and Shine (Raffi album), 1982
 Rise & Shine (Sierra Leone's Refugee All Stars album), 2010
 Rise & Shine (Steppenwolf album), 1990
 Rise and Shine (The Adicts album), 2002
 Rise and Shine (The Bears album), 1988
 Rise and Shine (Randy Travis album), 2002

Songs

 "Rise and Shine" (Poe song), 1998
 "Rise and Shine" (The Cardigans song), 1994
 "Rise 'n' Shine", a 1971 song by Dick Damron
 "Rise and Shine", a song by Deorro from Good Evening
 "Rise and Shine", a song by J. Cole & Cubic Z from Cole World: The Sideline Story
 "Rise and Shine", a song by One Minute Silence from Buy Now... Saved Later
 "Rise and Shine", a song by Raffi, the title track from the 1982 album of the same name
 "Rise and Shine (children's song) (And Give God Your Glory, Glory)", a children's camp song
 "Rise and Shine", an instrumental tune that was the original theme music for the TV series The Flintstones
 "Rise and Shine", a famous verse sung by Kylie Jenner to Stormi, her daughter with rapper Travis Scott
 "Rise and Shine", a song by Niki and Gabi; a parody of Kylie Jenner's verse and written by Gabi DeMartino

Television and film 
 Rise and Shine (film), a 1941 film starring Jack Oakie

Series
 Rise & Shine (TV series), a defunct morning talk show that aired in Columbus, Georgia, U.S.
 Rise & Shine, a Canadian TV series broadcast by Crossroads Television System
 Rise & Shine, a Filipino TV program broadcast by UNTV
 Rise & Shine, a Pakistani TV series broadcast by PTV Global

Episodes
 "Rise and Shine (Agents of S.H.I.E.L.D.)", a 2018 episode of Agents of S.H.I.E.L.D.
 "Rise and Shine (SpongeBob SquarePants)", a 2007 episode of SpongeBob SquarePants

Novels 
 Rise and Shine (novel) by Anna Quindlen (2006)